Nir Hod (born 1970) is an Israeli artist based in New York.

Life and work
Nir Hod began his career in video, works in sculpture but is known for his high realism paintings. Hod studied at Jerusalem's Bezalel Academy and New York's Cooper Union School of Art. His work investigates old notions of hyper-seriousness and personal authenticity. Hod's realistic takes on rakish narcissism examine androgyny, identity, sexual confusion, and excess. As Richard Vine wrote in the catalogue for Hod’s survey exhibition at the Tel Aviv Museum of Art, “From the beginning of his career, Nir Hod has opposed the ideology that labels sumptuousness an esthetic sin. His work openly substitutes the pleasure principle and a fluid multiplicity of selves for the old notions of high seriousness and personal authenticity.” In his recent series of “Genius” paintings and sculptures, Hod depicted aristocratic young men and women whose cherubic cheeks contrast with their scornful expressions and smoldering cigarettes.

For his solo exhibition at Paul Kasmin Gallery, Mother, Hod created a series of paintings that reference the iconic photograph, taken by the Nazi photographer Franz Konrad, of Nazi soldiers clearing out the Warsaw Ghetto during the Second World War. Although most of the scholarship and speculation about this photograph has centered on the identity of the young boy with his arms raised, Hod’s paintings focus on the woman in profile closest to the photographer. By removing this faceless and often overlooked woman from the historical context of the original photograph, he asks the viewer to consider who she was and to imagine the life that she could have had. Hod depicts her posing or dancing against a lush, cinematically lit background, a beautiful handbag draped across her arm.  Alluring and fashionable, the woman in these paintings has completely escaped from the horrible reality of the original photograph.

Selected solo exhibitions
2020: "The Life We Left Behind", Kohn Gallery, Los Angeles 
2018: "The Life We Left Behind", Gavlak Gallery, Palm Bech
2018: "The Life We Left Behind", Makasiini Contemporary Gallery, Finland
2015: "Life and Death of a Star", Michael Fuchs Gallery, Berlin , Germany
2014: “Once Every Thing Was Much Better Even the Future”, Paul Kasmin Gallery, New York
2012: “Mother,” Paul Kasmin Gallery, New York
2011: “Genius,” Paul Kasmin Gallery, New York
2008: “Nova 7,” Alon Segev Gallery, Israel
2007: “Faded Heartache,” Davide Gallo Gallery, Berlin
2006: “You Are Not Alone,” Jack Shainman Gallery, New York
2005: “Forever,” Tel Aviv Museum of Art, Tel Aviv
“Luna a Las Vegas,” Alon Segev Gallery, Tel Aviv
2001: “Destiny's Days,” Rosenfeld Gallery, Tel Aviv
2000: “Heroes’ Tears,” The Borowsky Gallery at the Gershman Y, Philadelphia
“Controversial Innocence,” Rosenfeld Gallery, Tel Aviv
“Nir Hod,” Liebman Magnan Gallery, New York
1999: “Forever,” Lime Light Club, New York
1998: “Forever,” Liebman Magnan Gallery, New York; Wolfson Galleries at Miami-Dade College, Miami
“Bleeding Hearts,” The Opera House, Tel Aviv
1997: “DOHRIN: The Last Painting,” The Museum of Israeli Art, Ramat Gan, Israel
“A Souvenir from November,” Mary Fauzi Gallery, Tel Aviv
1996: “The Brush of the Heart,” Noga Gallery of Contemporary Art, Tel Aviv

Selected press
 Shiffman, Allyson, "Nir Hod and the Importance of Narcissism," Interview, 7/13.
 Cembalest, Robin, "Painting Auschwitz Blue," ArtNews, 1/10/13.
 Phelan, Amy, "Document No.46: New Geniuses Born," Document Journal, Fall '12/Winter '13.
 Cembalest, Robin, "Holocaust Imagery As Art," Tablet Magazine, 3/26/12.
 Slenske, Michael, "The Kids Are All Right? The Paintings of Nir Hod," Art in America, 5/16/11.

References

External links
 Nir Hod's Website
 Examples of Nir Hod's Work (Sculptures, Paintings, Photographs)
 Catalogue essay by Tami Katz-Freiman, from Hod's solo exhibition at the Tel Aviv Museum of Art
 Nir Hod Interview (Video)
  Nir Hod the Man (Review)
  Contemporary Art and the Holocaust, Nir Hod's "Mother"

Realist artists
1970 births
Living people
Cooper Union alumni
Israeli portrait painters